Isoup Ganthy (12 November 1929 – 6 December 1976) was a Cambodian equestrian. He competed in the individual jumping event at the 1956 Summer Olympics. He was arrested by the Khmer Rouge and died in the Tuol Sleng prison.

References

External links
 

1929 births
1976 deaths
Cambodian male equestrians
Olympic equestrians of Cambodia
Equestrians at the 1956 Summer Olympics
Sportspeople from Phnom Penh
Cambodian people of Indian descent
People who died in the Cambodian genocide